The 2018–19 season was Livingston's first season of play back in the top tier of Scottish football since 2006, having been promoted via the Premiership play-off from the Scottish Championship, at the end of the previous season. Livingston also competed in the League and Scottish Cup.

Summary

Management
Having led the club to consecutive promotions manager David Hopkin departed the club during the close season on 31 May 2018, having declined the offer of a new contract. First team coach David Martindale took charge of team affairs in the interim. On 30 June 2018, former Rangers and Scotland striker Kenny Miller was appointed as player-manager on a two-year contract. Livingston marked his first managerial appointment.

On 20 August 2018, after just seven games Miller parted company with Livingston. The club wished Miller to take up a full time managers role, rather than the dual role he was currently undertaking and he wished to continue his career as a footballer. Assistant manager David Martindale took over team affairs in the interim,  with Gary Holt being appointed as Head Coach three days later.

Results and fixtures

Premiership

League Cup

Scottish Cup

First team player statistics

Appearances
During the 2018–19 season, Livingston used thirty three players in competitive games. The table below shows the number of appearances and goals scored by each player.Scott Pittman and Declan Gallagher started every match of the season.

 

|-
|colspan="17"|Players who left the club during the season
|-

Disciplinary record
During the 2018–19 season, Livingston players were issued with Sixty-one yellow cards and four red. The table below shows the number of cards and type shown to each player. 
Last updated 18 May 2019

Team statistics

League table

League Cup table

Management statistics
Last updated on 18 May 2019

Transfers

In

Out

See also
List of Livingston F.C. seasons

Notes

References

Livingston F.C. seasons
Livingston